"Don't Tell Me" is a song by Canadian singer-songwriter Avril Lavigne from her second studio album, Under My Skin (2004). "Don't Tell Me" was written by Lavigne and Evan Taubenfeld, while it was produced by Butch Walker. The song has been noted as having a "grungy sound". "Don't Tell Me" was released on March 15, 2004, by Arista Records as the lead single from Under My Skin and peaked at number 22 on the US Billboard Hot 100 that same year. In an AOL Radio listener's poll, "Don't Tell Me" was voted Lavigne's ninth-best song.

Background and composition
"Don't Tell Me" has been noted as having a "grungy sound", which builds from a folk-rock verse to a hard rock chorus like a Morissette song When asked what "Don't Tell Me" was about, Lavigne said:

She also said in a 2007 interview:

Critical reception
Reviewing the album Under My Skin, David Browne of Entertainment Weekly described "Don't Tell Me" as such: "Lavigne herself sounds more burdened; ... the ska8erboi of the first album has turned out to be a selfish, nasty creep who leaves when she won't go to bed with him". Blender Music wrote that unlike "Sk8er Boi", the up-with-abstinence single "Don’t Tell Me" finds her kicking him out of bed. The Guardian was mixed: "Current single "Don't Tell Me" at least has some relevant advice to impart to her pubescent female fans: it depicts a confused and angry Lavigne fending off an over-eager boyfriend."

PopMatters was favorable: "The first single, "Don't Tell Me", is probably the best song on the album, with the kind of wonderfully effusive movement that makes the best pop so damn irresistible. It starts slow and quiet, building to the first chorus, ebbs back, builds to another chorus, drops down into a bridge before coming back with a skull-crunching third chorus that leaves the riff firmly implanted in your skull. One or two reprises and we're out like a light, end of song. At that point you're either convinced or not." Rolling Stone was positive: "The lead single, "Don't Tell Me," might be her most Avril-ish song yet, a petulant kiss-off to a horny boy. As the guitars get revved up behind her, she asks, "Did I not tell you that I'm not like that girl/The one who gives it all away, yeah/Did you think that I was going to give it up to you?" The syntax may be tortured, but the singer sounds just fine: a righteous prude, confidently fending off the creeps." Yahoo Music! liked the song but was angry because there are spelling mistakes in booklet: "we now have a stronger, more confident Avril - forthright in her determination not to lose her cherry on 'Don't Tell Me', which coyly spells 'ass' with an 'a' and two asterixes on the CD booklet, bitterly writing songs about doomed relationships."

Accolades

Commercial performance
"Don't Tell Me" debuted at number 22 on the US Billboard Hot 100, and it stayed on the chart for 20 weeks, on the year end of the Hot 100 for 2004, the song charted at number 92. On the US Adult Top 40 chart, it peaked at number 10 and stayed on the chart for 26 weeks, and peaked at number 9 on the US Mainstream Top 40 chart. The song was certified Gold in the United States RIAA after eight months reaching 500,000 copies of the single.

In the UK, the song debuted at number five and it spent fifteen weeks on the chart. n Australia, it debuted at number ten and spent nine weeks on the chart, it was certified Gold in Australia with 35,000 units sold. In Croatia, the song was peaked at number two it was Lavigne's highest peaking song on the chart. In Italy, it was peaked at number four and it spent twenty weeks on the chart. In Switzerland, it was peaked at number nine and it spent twenty weeks on the chart. Overall, "Don't Tell Me" had entered the top ten in twelve countries.

Music video

The accompanying music video for "Don't Tell Me" was directed by Liz Friedlander, and filmed in Los Angeles in March 2004.

Synopsis
The video tells the story of the song. It opens with Lavigne's boyfriend leaving her apartment. After taking her anger out on her bedroom and mirror, she follows him around the city. During the bridge of the song, her boyfriend sees her in many places at once, so he is feeling guilty and her feelings are weighing heavily on his mind. At the end of the video, she decides that he is better off without her and lets him walk away, and in the final shot she begins to float above the surface.

Reception
The video was nominated for Best Pop Video at the 2004 MTV Video Music Awards, but lost to No Doubt's video for "It's My Life".

Track listings and formats
 Australian CD single
 "Don't Tell Me"  – 3:26
 "Don't Tell Me" (acoustic) – 3:38
 "Take Me Away"  – 2:55
 European CD single
 "Don't Tell Me"  – 3:26
 "Don't Tell Me" (acoustic) – 3:38
 Japanese CD single
 "Don't Tell Me"  – 3:26
 "Take Me Away"  – 2:55

Credits and personnel
Credits and personnel are adapted from the Under My Skin album liner notes.
 Avril Lavigne – vocals, writer
 Butch Walker – producer, electric guitar, bass, keyboards, percussion, programming, and background vocals
 Evan Taubenfeld – writer, electric guitar, acoustic guitar, background vocals
 Kenny Cresswell – drums
 Russ-T Cobb – recording
 Dan Chase – Pro-Tools engineering
 Sean Loughlin – engineering assistant
 Mauricio Cersosimo – engineering assistant
 Tom Sweeney – engineering assistant
 Tom Lord-Alge – mixing
 Femio Hernandez – mixing assistant
 Christie Priode – production coordinator

Charts and certifications

Weekly charts

Year-end charts

Certifications

Release history

References

External links
"Don't Tell Me" music video
Avril Lavigne's Official Site

2004 singles
2004 songs
Arista Records singles
Avril Lavigne songs
Music videos directed by Liz Friedlander
RCA Records singles
Rock ballads
Song recordings produced by Butch Walker
Songs written by Avril Lavigne
Songs written by Evan Taubenfeld
Sony BMG singles

lt:Under My Skin#Don't Tell Me
Grunge songs
Canadian hard rock songs
Folk rock songs